The Electric Circus was a nightclub located at 19-25 St. Marks Place between Second and Third Avenues  in the East Village neighborhood of Manhattan, New York City, from 1967 to August 1971.  The club was created by Jerry Brandt, Stanton J. Freeman and their partners and designed by Chermayeff & Geismar.  With its invitation (from one of its press releases) to "play games, dress as you like, dance, sit, think, tune in and turn on," and its mix of light shows, music, circus performers and experimental theater, the Electric Circus embodied the wild and creative side of 1960s club culture.

Flame throwing jugglers and trapeze artists performed between musical sets, strobe lights flashed over a huge dance floor, and multiple projectors flashed images and footage from home movies. Seating was varied, with sofas provided. The Electric Circus became "New York's ultimate mixed-media pleasure dome, and its hallucinogenic light baths enthralled every sector of New York society." Its hedonistic atmosphere also influenced the later rise of disco culture and discotheques.

Experimental bands such as The Velvet Underground, jam bands such as The Grateful Dead, soul acts such as Ike & Tina Turner, and avant-garde composers such as minimalist Terry Riley and electronic music pioneer Morton Subotnick played at the club. Other bands played there before they were famous, such as Raven, the Allman Brothers Band, Sly & the Family Stone, and The Chambers Brothers.

History

Early history

The cavernous ballroom space with a balcony originally consisted of four buildings built in 1831 as townhouses.  When the neighborhood gradually became the heart of Little Germany, with a population of German immigrant workers, #19 and 21 were purchased in 1870 by the Arlon Club, a German music society, for their clubhouse. The club moved, and a real estate developer bought 19, 21, and 23 between 1887–1888 and merged them into a ballroom and community hall called Arlington Hall, which hosted weddings, dances, political events and union meetings, among many other events. In 1914 a shootout between "Dopey" Benny Fein's Jewish gang and Jack Sirocco's Italian mob, an event that marked the beginning of the predominance of the Italian American gangsters over the Jewish American gangsters, took place in the hall.  Arlington Hall also had some notable speakers including Police Commissioner Theodore Roosevelt (1895) and William Randolph Hearst (1905).

During the 1920s, the buildings were bought by the Polish National Home, which combined them with 25 St. Marks Place for use by Polish organizations and a Polish restaurant.

1960s: Warhol and The Velvet Underground
By the 1960s, the bohemianism and nightlife previously associated with New York's Greenwich Village was growing in what would later be called the East Village.  The Polish National Home was turned into the Dom Restaurant – the name came from the Polish for "home", derived from Polski Dom Narodowy ("Polish National Home") – with Stanley Tolkin's  "Stanley's Bar" – where The Fugs played in the  mid-1960s – downstairs, slightly below street level.  Jackie Cassen and Rudi Stern began leasing the ballroom on the floor above Stanley's Bar for their "Theater of Light" show.

Then in 1966 artist Andy Warhol and Paul Morrissey – who directed many of Warhol's films, and who became a sometime manager of the Velvet Underground – sublet the ballroom from Cassen and Stern, and turned the Dom into a nightclub.  The Velvet Underground was the house band, and their performances under Andy Warhol's influence were accompanied by many light effects with the added touches of projected movies and projected photographs, all going on at the same time.  The experience was called the "Exploding Plastic Inevitable."

New management and closing
Later in 1966 the club, under different management by Albert Grossman, was briefly called the Balloon Farm and in 1967 the lease was transferred to Brandt Freeman Int'l, Ltd. the General partner of The Electric Circus Company.  Cat Mother & the All Night Newsboys was engaged as one of the first house bands under the new management.

By 1970 the "tune in, turn on" hippie culture was in decline. When a small bomb, reportedly planted by a member of the Black Panther Party exploded on the dance floor on March 22, 1970, injuring fifteen people, the negative publicity accelerated the decline of the club; it closed a year and a half later in August 1971. According to an AP news story that appeared in the Toledo Blade on March 31, 1970, the Black Panther Party denied any connection to the student, Ishmael Brown, who reportedly planted the bomb.

After the Electric Circus closed, the building no longer functioned as a club or space for regular public performances, but the building was not significantly physically altered until 2003 when a major renovation eliminated the ballroom and converted the building into upscale apartments and retail space.

In the 1980s the building was used as an Alcoholics Anonymous dry disco for a period.

List of performers 

 The Velvet Underground
 Morton Subotnick
 The Chambers Brothers
 The Grateful Dead
 Ike & Tina Turner
 Sly & The Family Stone
 The Voices of East Harlem
 Ten Wheel Drive
 Raven
 Deep Purple
 Soft White Underbelly
 Rock Island
 Terry Riley
 Wishbone Ash

Popular culture
The Electric Circus is mentioned (as a spontaneously fabricated supposed avant garde novel) in the television show “Succession” (S2 E5 approx. 20m). The actual club is depicted in a scene of  Mad Men season 6, episode 3 ("To Have and To Hold", set in early 1968), during which Joan Harris and her friend Kate go out on the town.

The Electric Circus is also mentioned in Andrew Holleran’s novel Dancer from the Dance as the building where Malone lives. It is described as "a discotheque that began fashionable and white, and eventually became unfashionable and black."

References

External links
 New York Times "Streetscapes" from November 18, 1998
 Hippies & New Frontier On 'Desolation Row' Village Voice article on the opening of the club by Jack Newfield July 6, 1967

Nightclubs in Manhattan
Andy Warhol
Cultural history of New York City
Music venues in Manhattan
Former music venues in New York City
Defunct nightclubs in New York (state)